The  Levene Gouldin & Thompson Tennis Challenger  is a tennis tournament held in Binghamton, New York, United States since 1994. A Binghamton and Vestal area law firm, Levene Gouldin & Thompson, has been the title sponsor of the tournament since 2007. The event is part of the ''ATP challenger series and is played on outdoor hard courts.  Former Wimbledon champion and Olympic Gold medalist Andy Murray won the event in 2005. The 2020 tournament was cancelled due to the COVID-19 pandemic and quarantine.

Past finals

Singles

Doubles

External links 
 
ITF Search
ATP Vault

 
ATP Challenger Tour
Hard court tennis tournaments in the United States
Sports in Binghamton, New York